Double Daring is a 1926 American silent Western film directed by Richard Thorpe and starring Hal Taliaferro,
Jean Arthur and Toby Wing. It is now considered to be a lost film.

Synopsis
When the bank Wally Meeker works as a clerk in is robbed, he is wrongly accused of complicity and arrested. Escaping he goes into the hills in search of the gang behind the raid. Eventually cleared of any guilt he returns home to marry Marie Wells, the daughter of the bank's owner.

Cast
 Hal Taliaferro as Wally Meeker 
 J.P. Lockney as Banker Wells
 Jean Arthur as Marie Wells
 Hank Bell as Lee Falcon
 Slim Whitaker as Blackie Gorman
 Toby Wing as Nan
 N.E. Hendrix as The Law

References

Bibliography
 Connelly, Robert B. The Silents: Silent Feature Films, 1910-36, Volume 40, Issue 2. December Press, 1998.
 Munden, Kenneth White. The American Film Institute Catalog of Motion Pictures Produced in the United States, Part 1. University of California Press, 1997.

External links
 

1926 films
1926 Western (genre) films
1920s English-language films
American silent feature films
Silent American Western (genre) films
American black-and-white films
Films directed by Richard Thorpe
1920s American films